The Lincoln Branch Peoria Public Library is a Carnegie library located at 1312 West Lincoln Avenue in Peoria, Illinois. Built in 1910, the building served as the first dedicated library building on Peoria's South Side. The South Side branch library opened in 1903 in a building called the Neighborhood House; however, it had outgrown its space in the building by 1909. The city petitioned the Carnegie Foundation for funding for a new library; the Foundation provided a $20,000 grant for the building, and the city passed a $2,000 annual tax to cover the library's maintenance. Peoria architecture firm Hotchkiss & Harris supplied a Classical Revival design for the building, and construction began in 1910 and was completed the following year. The library became popular with neighborhood residents, setting city records for daily circulation; it also held special collections serving the city's Lebanese and German immigrant communities.

The library was added to the National Register of Historic Places on May 28, 2014.

References

External links
 Lincoln Branch, Peoria Public Library

Libraries on the National Register of Historic Places in Illinois
Carnegie libraries in Illinois
Library buildings completed in 1911
Neoclassical architecture in Illinois
National Register of Historic Places in Peoria County, Illinois
Buildings and structures in Peoria, Illinois